Round Bottom may refer to:

Round-bottom flask, a type of flask
Round Bottom, West Virginia, an unincorporated community in Wetzel County